Sinodorcadion punctuscapum is a species of beetle in the family Cerambycidae. It was described by Xie, Shi and Wang in 2013. It is known from China.

References

Morimopsini
Beetles described in 2013